Christian Marcel Proulx (born December 10, 1973) is a Canadian retired professional ice hockey defenceman who played seven games in the National Hockey League for the Montreal Canadiens.

Regular season and playoffs

External links

1973 births
Canadian ice hockey defencemen
DEG Metro Stars players
Fredericton Canadiens players
Hershey Bears players
Ice hockey people from Quebec
Milwaukee Admirals (IHL) players
Montreal Canadiens draft picks
Montreal Canadiens players
San Francisco Spiders players
Saint-Jean Lynx players
Living people
Canadian expatriate ice hockey players in Germany